The following are the Pulitzer Prizes for 1981.

Journalism awards
Public Service:
Charlotte (N.C.) Observer, for its series on "Brown Lung: A Case of Deadly Neglect".
Local General or Spot News Reporting:
Staff of  Longview (Wash.) Daily News , for its coverage of the Mt. St. Helens story, including the photographs by Roger A. Werth.
Local Investigative Specialized Reporting:
Clark Hallas and Robert B. Lowe of  Arizona Daily Star , for their investigation of the University of Arizona Athletic Department.
National Reporting:
John M. Crewdson of The New York Times, for his coverage of illegal aliens and immigration.
International Reporting:
Shirley Christian of The Miami Herald, for her dispatches from Central America.
Feature Writing:
Teresa Carpenter of The Village Voice, New York City.(The prize in this category was originally awarded to Janet Cooke of The Washington Post, but the award was returned after it was discovered that the story for which she received the award was a fabrication.)
Commentary:
Dave Anderson of The New York Times, for his commentary on sports.
Criticism:
Jonathan Yardley of Washington Star, for his book reviews.
Editorial Writing:
 (No Award)
Editorial Cartooning:
Mike Peters of Dayton (Ohio) Daily News
Spot News Photography:
Larry C. Price of Fort Worth (Texas) Star Telegram, for his photographs from Liberia.
Feature Photography:
Taro M. Yamasaki of Detroit Free Press, for his photographs of the Jackson (Mich.) State Prison.

Letters, Drama and Music Awards
Fiction:
A Confederacy of Dunces by John Kennedy Toole (a posthumous publication) (Louisiana State U. Press)
History:
American Education: The National Experience, 1783-1876 by Lawrence A. Cremin (Harper & Row)
Biography or Autobiography:
Peter the Great: His Life and World by Robert K. Massie (Knopf)
Poetry:
The Morning of the Poem by James Schuyler (Farrar, Straus)
General Non-Fiction:
Fin-de-Siècle Vienna: Politics and Culture by Carl E. Schorske (Knopf)
Drama:
Crimes of the Heart by Beth Henley (Viking)
Music:
No Award

External links
 

Pulitzer Prizes by year
Pulitzer Prize
Pulitzer Prize